Gilbert Livingston Wilson (1868 – 1930) was an American ethnographer and a Presbyterian  minister.  He and his brother recorded the lives of three Hidatsa family members; Buffalo Bird Woman, her brother Henry Wolf Chief, and her son Edward Goodbird.  Wilson's extensive and detailed writings remain an important source of information for historians and anthropologists, as well as the Hidatsa people.

Life and work

Gilbert Wilson was born in Springfield, Ohio, in 1868.  He earned a bachelor's degree from Princeton Theological Seminary in 1899 after graduating from Wittenberg College, and was ordained a Presbyterian minister in Moorhead, Minnesota.  He then returned to Wittenberg and earned a master's degree.  In 1902, he became a pastor in Mandan, North Dakota.  Wilson was excited to live near Native Americans, as he enjoyed studying Indian life and folklore, and aspired to write sympathetic children's books which accurately depicted Indian life and customs.  Wilson married Ada Myers of Springfield in 1909 and had one child, who died suddenly in early adulthood.  Later in life, Wilson was both a pastor in Stillwater, Minnesota, as well as a professor of anthropology at Macalester College in Saint Paul, where he also served as pastor.

Wilson's career as an ethnographer began when he visited the Sioux at Standing Rock Reservation in 1905.  Two books came out of this early work; The Iktomi Myth (1906) and Indian Hero Tales (1907).  The next year, Gilbert and his brother Frederick visited the elderly Hidatsa woman, Buffalo Bird Woman, at Fort Berthold Indian Reservation in North Dakota.  This began in earnest Wilson's careful documentation of Hidatsa life.  In following years, he included other family members of Buffalo Bird Woman in his scholarship, most prominently her brother Henry Wolf Chief and her son Edward Goodbird.  Wilson was also adopted into the Prairie Chicken Clan as a son to Buffalo Bird Woman and a brother to Edward in 1909.

Among the many published works (some posthumously) that came out of this relationship, were the ethnographic works Agriculture of the Hidatsa: An Indian Interpretation (1917), The Horse and Dog in Hidatsa Culture (1924), Hidatsa Eagle Trapping (1929), The Hidatsa Earthlodge (1934) and the children's books Myths of the Red Children (1907) and Indian Hero Tales (1916).  He also published Buffalo-Bird-Woman's and Goodbird's autobiography in Waheene: an Indian Girl’s Story, Told by Herself and Goodbird, the Indian.

Early in Wilson's work at Fort Berthold, he generated great controversy when he bought the Waterbuster clan medicine bundle from Wolf Chief, who converted to Christianity and was wary of shouldering the responsibility of bundle ownership.  Wilson then sold the bundle to a wealthy New York collector, which angered many Hidatsa, especially those from the Waterbuster clan, as well as the curator of the State Historical Society of North Dakota who tried to bar Wilson from the reservation.  However, Wilson's adopted family supported him and allowed him to continue his research,

As a student of Alfred Jenks, Wilson became a doctoral candidate in anthropology at the University of Minnesota in 1910.  He received his degree in 1916 with his dissertation, Agriculture of the Hidatsa: An Indian Interpretation, This work is a classic of northern Plains ethnography, and is still used by scholars today to gain insights into traditional Hidatsa farming practices.

Wilson died on June 8, 1930, and his wife donated his works to the Minnesota Historical Society.

Legacy
"[Hidatsa Eagle Trapping is] one of the finest masterpieces in all anthropological literature." -Claude Lévi-Strauss

“Among the Hidatsa I was taken down another peg.  The Reverend Gilbert L. Wilson was neither particularly cultivated nor in any sense intellectual, but he was a superb observer.  In the recording of ethnographic detail…I, the trained ethnologist, could not begin to compete with him.”  -Robert Lowie

“The Wilson collections of Hidatsa Indian ethnographic materials… are unusual among U.S. museum collections for Plains Indian tribes in terms of size, comprehensiveness, and documentation.”
As is demonstrated by the above quotes, Gilbert Wilson was an astute observer, sensitive and talented writer, as well as a thorough and indefatigable researcher.  His research used what was then considered state of the art methods, such as comprehensive notes and material samples, extensive photography and sketches, along with sound recordings on wax cylinders, and he was also one of the earliest practitioners of biographical anthropology with American Indians, although this is largely overlooked.  According to Claude Lévi-Strauss, Wilson “had the inspired idea of letting his informants talk freely, and of respecting the harmonious and spontaneous fusion, in their stories, anecdotes, and meditation ..."

Beyond practicing relatively enlightened and sensitive anthropology, Wilson also left an enormous record of published writings, notes, photos, and letters.  This has been a boon to historians, archaeologists and other anthropologists interested in past cultures, as well as the Hidatsa people themselves, who after more than a century of systematic assimilation, can have a material record to complement what still exists in their collective oral literature.

Selected publications

 1903	Little Ugly Boy and the Bear; and, The Rainbow Snake. Mandan, ND.
 1904	Indian Legends. Woman’s Home Companion 31: 47-48
 1906	The Iktomi Myth. Collections of the State Historical Society of North Dakota 1: 474-475
 1907	Myths of the Red Children. Illus. Frederick N. Wilson. Ginn & Co. Boston, MA.
 1916	Indian Hero Tales. Illus. Frederick N. Wilson. American Book Co. New York, NY.
 1917	Agriculture of the Hidatsa Indians: An Indian Interpretation. Studies in the Social Sciences, No. 9. University of  Minnesota, Minneapolis, MN.
 1924	The Horse and Dog in Hidatsa Culture. Anthropological Papers of the American Museum of Natural History 15: 125–311.
 1926	Hidatsa Eagle Trapping. Anthropological Papers of the American Museum of Natural History 30: 99-245.
 1934	The Hidatsa Earthlodge. Ed. Bella Weitzner. Anthropological Papers of the American Museum of Natural History 33: 341–420.

Notes

References

 Baker, Gerard. 1987. The Hidatsa Religious Experience. In The Way to Independence. Ed. Carolyn Gilman & Mary Jane Schneider. Minnesota Historical Society, St. Paul, MN.
 Gilman, Carolyn & Mary Jane Schneider. 1987. Wolf Chief Sells the Shrine. In The Way to Independence. Ed. Carolyn Gilman & Mary Jane Schneider. Minnesota Historical Society, St. Paul, MN.
 Goodbird, Edward. 1914. Goodbird the Indian: His Story, Told by Himself to Gilbert L. Wilson. Illus. Frederick N. Wilson. Fleming H. Revell, New York, NY. Reprint Minnesota Historical Society Press, St. Paul, MN. 1985.
 Lowie, Robert, H. 1959. Robert H. Lowie: Ethnologist: A Personal Record. University of California Press, Berkeley, CA.
 Maxidiwiac. 1921. Waheenee: an Indian Girl’s Story: Told by Herself to Gilbert L. Wilson, Ph.D. Illus. Frederick N. Wilson. Webb Publishing Co., St. Paul, MN.
 Schneider, Mary Jane. 1985. Introduction. In Goodbird the Indian: His Story, Told by Himself to Gilbert L. Wilson. Illus. Frederick N. Wilson. Fleming H. Revell, New York, NY. Reprint Minnesota Historical Society Press, St. Paul, MN. 1985.
 Woolworth, Alan, R. 1987. Contributions of the Wilsons to the Study of the Hidatsa. In The Way to Independence. Ed. Carolyn Gilman & Mary Jane Schneider. Minnesota Historical Society, St. Paul, MN.

External links
 
  State Historical Society of North Dakota
 Minnesota State Historical Society Inventory of G.L. Wilson’s Papers
  University of Minnesota, Twin Cities

1868 births
1930 deaths
American ethnologists
American Episcopal clergy
People from Springfield, Ohio
Wittenberg University alumni
Princeton Theological Seminary alumni
University of Minnesota College of Liberal Arts alumni
Macalester College faculty